Addison may refer to:

Places

Canada
Addison, Ontario

United States
Addison, Alabama
Addison, Illinois
Addison Street in Chicago, Illinois which runs by Wrigley Field
Addison, Kentucky
Addison, Maine
Addison, Michigan
Addison, New York
Addison (village), New York
Addison, Ohio
Addison, Pennsylvania
Addison, Tennessee, an unincorporated community in McMinn County
Addison, Texas
Addison, Vermont
Addison, West Virginia, the official name of the town commonly called Webster Springs, WV
Addison, Wisconsin, a town
Addison (community), Wisconsin, an unincorporated community
Addison County, Vermont
Addison Township (disambiguation), several places

Other uses
Addison (given name)
Addison (surname)
Addison (restaurant), a Michelin-starred restaurant in San Diego
Addison Road (band), an American band
Addison Motor Company, British car manufacturer
Addison's disease, endocrine disorder
Addison, a Beanie Baby baseball-themed teddy bear made by Ty, Inc.

See also
 Addison Railroad (disambiguation)
 Addison Road (disambiguation)
 Addison station (disambiguation)
 Ad (name)